Volleyball events were contested at the 1982 Central American and Caribbean Games in Havana, Cuba.

References
 

1982 Central American and Caribbean Games
1982
1982 in volleyball
International volleyball competitions hosted by Cuba